We Are All We Need is the third studio album by British progressive trance group Above & Beyond. It was released on 16 January 2015 by Anjunabeats. The album is their first studio album to feature new material since Group Therapy (2011). It is the first album released under the name Above & Beyond not to feature collaborations with British singer-songwriter Richard Bedford. However it features a track with Justine Suissa, the group's longtime collaborator on the OceanLab project.

Critical reception

We Are All We Need received generally positive reception from music critics. Matt Joseph from We Got This Covered gave the album a 4/5 rating, stating that the album's "catchy hooks, angelic vocals and club ready anthems" added to the group's already impressing discography. Krystal Spence from Your EDM compared We Are All We Need to Above & Beyond's previous album, Group Therapy, stating that the former was "much more uplifting" than its predecessor. Krystal also praised the group for continuing their tradition of producing tracks which are "easy to learn", allowing listeners to effortlessly sing along with the tracks. inthemix's Angus Paterson noted the focus of club-based tracks on the record, and stated that the album "ain’t something that will please those enthused with the deeper, more progressive sounds heard on their Tri-State debut". He went on by writing that although there was less of a consistent theme which drew Group Therapy together, the record managed to be the "most polished album yet; functioning both as A-grade pop music, and mass-appeal club music with soul."

In a mixed review, Jon O'Brien from Music Is My Oxygen described the album as packing with "skyscraping choruses, uplifting synth hooks and Balearic beats", but criticized the track "Blue Sky Action" for being a generic attempt at copying the success of Swedish House Mafia's dance-pop sound and stated that "We Are All We Need delivers little you haven’t heard before". Lanre Bakare from The Guardian and Jessica Wall from The Up Coming both gave the album a 2/5 rating, with Bakare calling We Are All We Need an "overwrought, nigh-on comical take on dance music". Wall dubbed the record as "just a collection of songs", writing that there is no sense of journey and aesthetic amongst its tracks as the record progresses.

Commercial performance
The album debuted at number 12 on the UK Albums Chart, becoming the group's highest-charting album. In the United States, We Are All We Need debuted at number 34 on the Billboard 200, becoming the group's highest-charting album. The album also debuted at number one on the Dance/Electronic Albums chart. It sold 14,000 copies in its first week in the US, the group's biggest first-week sales.

Track listing

Notes
 signifies an additional producer

Charts

Weekly charts

Year-end charts

Release history

References

Above & Beyond (band) albums
2015 albums
Anjunabeats albums